is a Japanese politician of the Liberal Democratic Party, a member of the House of Councillors in the Diet (national legislature). A native of Amagasaki, Hyogo and graduate of Osaka University, he joined the government of Osaka Prefecture in 1957. After serving as deputy mayor of Osaka Prefecture, he was elected to the House of Councillors for the first time in 1995.

References

External links 
  in Japanese.

Members of the House of Councillors (Japan)
Living people
1934 births
People from Amagasaki
Liberal Democratic Party (Japan) politicians
Osaka University alumni
Jōdo Shinshū Buddhist priests